Bouma is a West Frisian surname. Notable people with the surname include:

:nl:Arnold Bouma (1932–2011), Dutch geologist
The Bouma sequence in sedimentology is named after him
Clarence Bouma (1891–1962), Dutch-born American theologian and professor
Gary Bouma (born 1942), American-born Australian professor of sociology
Herman Bouma (born 1934), Dutch vision researcher and gerontechnologist
Johan Bouma (born 1940), Dutch soil scientist
Johannes Lützen Bouma (born 1934), Dutch economist
Lance Bouma (born 1990), Canadian  ice hockey centre
Nicole Bouma, Canadian voice actress
Thijs Bouma (born 1992), Dutch footballer
Wilfred Bouma (born 1978), Dutch footballer

See also
9706 Bouma, asteroid, named after Dutch amateur astronomer Reinder J. Bouma (born 1949)

Surnames of Frisian origin